Laghi di Lavagnina are two artificial lakes in the municipalities of Casaleggio Boiro, Mornese and Bosio in the Province of Alessandria, Piedmont, Italy.

Geography 
The lowest lake is named Lago Inferiore and the upper one Lago Superiore. Their inflow and outflow stream is Torrente Gorzente.

Nature conservation 
The lakes are included in the Piedmontese natural park of the Capanne di Marcarolo.

References 

Lakes of Piedmont
Province of Alessandria
Reservoirs in Italy